Aminta Buenaño Rugel (born Santa Lucía Canton, Guayas Province, 1958) is an Ecuadorian writer and politician.

She has worked for the publication El Universo, in Guayaquil. In 2007, she joined Ecuadorian Constituent Assembly, as a member of PAIS Alliance. 
She was congressional vice-president.
She has also helped write the 2008 Constitution of Ecuador.
She was appointed in 2011 as Ecuador's ambassador to Spain, and in 2014 as ambassador to Nicaragua.

Prizes
International Short Story Award Jauja de Valladolid (1979).
National Short Story Award Diario El Tiempo.

Works
La mansión de los sueños (Guayaquil, 1985)
La otra piel (Guayaquil, 1992)
Mujeres divinas (2006)

Anthologies
Mujeres ecuatorianas en el relato (1988)
Primera Bienal del Cuento Ecuatoriano "Pablo Palacio" (Quito, 1991)
Veintiún cuentistas ecuatorianos (Quito, 1996)
Antología de narradoras ecuatorianas (Quito, 1997)
40 cuentos ecuatorianos (Quito, 1997)
Antología básica del cuento ecuatoriano (Quito, 1998)

References

External links
 Information

1958 births
Living people
People from Santa Lucía Canton
PAIS Alliance politicians
Members of the Ecuadorian Constituent Assembly (2007–2008)
Catholic socialists
Ecuadorian women novelists
Ecuadorian women writers
Ecuadorian journalists
Ecuadorian women journalists
Ecuadorian women short story writers
Ecuadorian short story writers
20th-century short story writers
20th-century Ecuadorian women writers
21st-century short story writers
21st-century Ecuadorian women writers
21st-century Ecuadorian women politicians
21st-century Ecuadorian politicians
20th-century Ecuadorian writers
Ecuadorian women ambassadors
Ambassadors of Ecuador to Spain
Ambassadors of Ecuador to Nicaragua